Buffalo Killers is the debut studio album by American blues rock band Buffalo Killers.  It was released in October 2006 on Alive Naturalsound Records as a Compact Disc and a limited edition LP with yellow, swirled vinyl.

Track listing
All songs composed and arranged by Andrew Gabbard and Zachary Gabbard.

 "San Martine des Morelle" – 4:25
 "SS Nowhere" – 4:06
 "Heavens You Are" – 6:43
 "The Path Before Me" – 3:30
 "River Water" – 4:04
 "With Love" – 5:31
 "Children of War" – 4:32
 "Down in the Blue" – 3:43
 "Fit to Breathe" – 6:07
 "Something Real" – 4:27

Personnel
Buffalo Killers
 Andrew Gabbard – guitar, vocals, piano
 Zachary Gabbard – bass guitar, vocals, guitar
 Joseph Sebaali – drums, piano, harpsichord

Additional personnel
 John Curley – bass guitar on "SS Nowhere" and "Children of War"

Production
 John Curley – recording and production
 Dave Schultz – mastering
 Erin Volk – artwork
 Shawn Abnoxious – photography

Notes

2006 albums
Buffalo Killers albums
Alive Naturalsound Records albums